State Highway 157 is a former state highway near Falcon, Elbert and Kiowa in the U.S. state of Colorado. The highway was designated in 1923 and existed until the mid-1950s. Starting in Falcon, it followed Meridian Road north to Elbert. From there it followed Elbert Road (also called Elbert Highway) north to Kiowa before running northward on Kiowa–Bennett Road to a point north of Kiowa. In late 2011, the latter road was paved, creating a new north-south corridor east of Denver.

References

Former state highways in Colorado